Ashraf Hasan oghlu Hasanov (January 4, 1909 — August 9, 1983) was an Azerbaijani conductor, and pedagogue. He was awarded the title People's Artist of the Azerbaijan SSR.

Biography 
Ashraf Hasanov was born on January 4, 1909, in Nukha, Russian Empire. He studied in the orchestra class of the Azerbaijan State Conservatory in 1927–1932 and in the conducting class of the Moscow Conservatory in 1933–1938.

In 1938–1950 he conducted the symphony orchestra under the Azerbaijan Radio Committee. In 1932 and 1938–1979 he worked as a conductor at Azerbaijan State Opera and Ballet Theatre. In 1949–1962 he headed the opera preparation department at Azerbaijan State Conservatory. He was an associate professor.

Ashraf Hasanov conducted Azerbaijani and Western European operas and ballets such as "Leyli and Majnun", "Koroghlu" (Uzeyir Hajibeyov), "La traviata", "Aida" (Giuseppe Verdi), "Carmen" (Georges Bizet) at Azerbaijan State Opera and Ballet Theatre. He has toured in Georgia, Russia, Turkey, Ukraine, Bulgaria, Germany, Czech Republic and other countries.

A. Hasanov died on August 9, 1983, in Baku.

Awards 
 People's Artist of the Azerbaijan SSR — June 10, 1959
 Honored Artist of the Azerbaijan SSR — April 23, 1940
 Order of the Badge of Honour — April 17, 1938
 Honorary Decree of the Presidium of the Supreme Soviet of the Azerbaijan SSR — January 23, 1979

References

Literature 
 
 
 

Azerbaijani conductors (music)
Azerbaijani educators
1909 births
1983 deaths
Soviet conductors (music)
Soviet educators